Anjan Sundaram is an Indian author, journalist, academic, and television presenter. He is the author of three memoirs of journalism, Stringer, Bad News and Breakup, and has been called "one of the great reporters of our age" by the BBC foreign correspondent Fergal Keane.

Early life and education 

Sundaram was born in Ranchi, India, and grew up in Dubai. He studied at Rishi Valley School in India, and was awarded a gold medal in the Indian Physics Olympiad in 2000. After enrolling in the electrical engineering program at the Indian Institute of Technology Madras, he moved to the United States and graduated from Yale University in 2005. Sundaram earned a master's degree in mathematics as an undergraduate at Yale, studying abstract algebra under celebrated mathematician and activist Serge Lang.

Career 
He then turned down a job as a mathematician at Goldman Sachs, and began to write, reporting as a stringer for The New York Times and The Associated Press from the Democratic Republic of Congo and Rwanda. He taught journalism in 2016 at Brockwood Park, a school founded by Jiddu Krishnamurti. In 2018, he obtained a PhD in journalism from the University of East Anglia, studying under British author Giles Foden.

Stringer: A Reporter's Journey in the Congo 
Sundaram's debut Stringer: A Reporter's Journey in the Congo earned him comparisons to Ryszard Kapuściński and Nobel laureate V. S. Naipaul. Stringer was published by Sonny Mehta, the legendary editor of Kapuściński, Naipaul and several Nobel laureates, and was featured on The Daily Show with Jon Stewart, who called the book "remarkable". It was also a Royal African Society book of the year and a BBC book of the week. A feature of Sundaram's writing is his immersive portrayal of what it feels like to be in a place.

Bad News: Last Journalists in a Dictatorship 
Bad News: Last Journalists in a Dictatorship, about the rise of dictatorship in Rwanda, was published in January 2016 and named an Amazon book of the year. Noam Chomsky praised it for providing "insights about the human condition that reach far beyond the tragic story of Rwanda." Christiane Amanpour interviewed Anjan about the book in 2020. Bad News documents the persecution of journalists in Rwanda, including a non-exhaustive appendix of Rwandan journalists, many of whom were killed, disappeared, arrested, or forced into exile. The Guardian called it "an important book that should shatter any lingering faith people might hold in Kagame's hideous regime" and the Washington Post described it as "courageous and heartfelt."

Reportage 
In 2015, a jury of journalists including Jon Lee Anderson and Carlotta Gall awarded Sundaram the annual Frontline Club prize for his war reporting from the Central African Republic, calling his story "an excellent, highly original piece of reportage and writing, reminiscent of Ryzard Kapuściński and V.S. Naipaul at their best." Sundaram also received a Reuters environmental journalism prize in 2006 for his reporting from the Democratic Republic of Congo.

Television 
Sundaram hosted a four-part television series called Coded World in 2019, which explores how algorithms and artificial intelligence are changing humans. The series combines Sundaram's expertise in mathematics and journalism.

He also presented a four-part series in 2016 called Deciphering India with Anjan Sundaram, which explores the contentious rise of nationalism in India. The episodes were titled "Godmen", "The Sacred Cow", "The Great Indian Male" and "Identity".

Talks 
His TED talk in 2017, titled Why I risked my life to expose a government massacre, is about his reporting on remote conflicts. In 2016 he gave a talk called Detecting a Dictatorship at the Oslo Freedom Forum, about journalists who confronted Rwanda's authoritarian government.

Personal life 
He was married to the French-Canadian journalist and author, Nathalie Blaquiere, for nearly a decade, before they divorced in 2017. They have a daughter. He describes his marriage and divorce, along with his war correspondence, in his book Breakup: A Marriage in Wartime.

His mother is the author, journalist and actress Vasanti Sundaram.

References

External links 
 
 Anjan Sundaram's TED Talk
 Christiane Amanpour speaks to Anjan Sundaram 
 "'Bad News' Chronicles the Loss of Press Freedom in Rwanda", radio interview with Sundaram on NPR's All Things Considered (6 min., 2016)

Year of birth missing (living people)
Living people
Alumni of the University of East Anglia
Indian war correspondents
Indian male journalists
Yale University alumni
People from Ranchi
People from Dubai
Indian expatriates in the United Arab Emirates
Indian memoirists
Journalists from Jharkhand